Lake Armaccocha (possibly from Quechua arma bath / plough, qucha lake) is a lake in the Vilcanota mountain range in Peru. It is situated in the Cusco Region, Quispicanchi Province, Ocongate District. Lake Armaccocha lies south-west of Lake Singrenacocha and north-west of Mount Callangate.

References 

Lakes of Peru
Lakes of Cusco Region